Hall of fame is a type of attraction established for any field of endeavor to honor individuals of noteworthy achievement in that field.

Hall of Fame may also refer to:
 "Hall of Fame" (song), a 2012 song by The Script
 Hall of Fame (Count Basie album), an album by Count Basie recorded in 1956 and released in 1959
 Hall of Fame (The Moody Blues album), a 2000 live album by The Moody Blues
 Hall of Fame (Big Sean album), the second studio album by American rapper Big Sean
 Hall of Fame (Polo G album), the third studio album by American rapper Polo G
 Hall of Fame: A Tribute to Bob Marley's 50th Anniversary, an album by Bunny Wailer
 F2D Presents: Hall of Fame, a 2017 album by South African hip hop collective Fresh 2 Def

See also 
 Boxing Hall of Fame (disambiguation)
 Hall of Honor (disambiguation)
 List of halls and walks of fame